The Australian Square Kilometre Array Pathfinder (ASKAP) is a radio telescope array located at Murchison Radio-astronomy Observatory (MRO) in the Mid West region of Western Australia.

The facility began as a technology demonstrator for the international Square Kilometre Array (SKA), an internationally planned radio telescope which will be larger and more sensitive. The ASKAP site has been selected as one of the SKA's two central locations.

It is operated by the Commonwealth Scientific and Industrial Research Organisation (CSIRO) and forms part of the Australia Telescope National Facility. Construction commenced in late 2009 and first light was in October 2012.

Each antenna is equipped with a phased-array feed (PAF), significantly increasing the field of view. This design provides both fast survey speed and high sensitivity.

Description 
Development and construction of ASKAP was led by CSIRO Astronomy and Space Science (CASS), in collaboration with scientists and engineers in The Netherlands, Canada and the US, as well as colleagues from Australian universities and industry partners in China.

Design 

The construction and assembly of the dishes was completed in June 2012.

ASKAP was designed as a synoptic telescope with a wide field-of-view, large spectral bandwidth, fast survey speed, and a large number of simultaneous baselines. The greatest technical challenge was the design and construction of the phased array feeds, which had not previously been used for radio astronomy, and so presented many new technical challenges, as well as the largest data rate so far encountered in a radio telescope.

ASKAP is located in the Murchison district in Western Australia, a region that is extremely "radio-quiet" due to the low population density and resulting lack of radio interference (generated by human activity) that would otherwise interfere with weak astronomical signals. The radio quiet location is recognised as a natural resource and protected by the Australian Commonwealth and Western Australia State Government through a range of regulatory measures.

Data from ASKAP are transmitted from the MRO to a supercomputer (acting as a radio correlator) at the Pawsey Supercomputing Centre in Perth. The data are processed in near-real-time by a pipeline processor running purpose-built software. All data are made publicly available after quality checks by the ten ASKAP Survey Science Teams.

Survey science projects 

During ASKAP's first five years of full operation, at least 75% of its observing time will be used for large Survey Science Projects ASKAP is intended to study the following topics:
 Galaxy formation and gas evolution in the nearby Universe through extragalactic HI surveys
 Evolution, formation and population of galaxies across cosmic time via high resolution, continuum surveys
 Characterisation of the radio transient sky through detection and monitoring (including VLBI) of transient and variable sources, and
 Evolution of magnetic fields in galaxies over cosmic time through polarisation surveys.
Ten ASKAP Survey Science Projects have been selected to run in the first five years of operations. They are:

Highest priority 
 EMU: Evolutionary Map of the Universe
 WALLABY: Widefield ASKAP L-Band Legacy All-Sky Blind Survey

Lower priority 
 COAST: Compact Objects with ASKAP: Surveys and Timing
 CRAFT: The Commensal Real-time ASKAP Fast Transients survey
 DINGO: Deep Investigations of Neutral Gas Origins
 FLASH: The First Large Absorption Survey in HI
 GASKAP: The Galactic ASKAP Spectral Line Survey
 POSSUM: Polarization Sky Survey of the Universe's Magnetism
 VAST: An ASKAP Survey for Variables and Slow Transients
 VLBI: The High Resolution Components of ASKAP: Meeting the Long Baseline Specifications for the SKA

Construction and operational phases

Construction 
Construction of ASKAP started in 2009.

Boolardy Engineering Test Array 
Once six antennas were completed and equipped with  phased-array feeds, and backend electronics, the array was named the Boolardy Engineering Test Array (BETA). BETA operated from March 2014 to February 2016. It was the first aperture synthesis radio telescope to use phased array feed technology, enabling the formation of up to nine dual-polarisation beams.  A series of astronomical observations were made with BETA to test the operation of the phased array feeds, and to help the commissioning and operation of the final ASKAP telescope.

Design enhancement 
The first prototype phased-array feeds (PAF) proved the concept worked, but their performance was not optimum. In 2013–2014, while the BETA array was operational, significant sections of ASKAP were redesigned to improve performance in a process known as the ASKAP design enhancement (ADE). The main changes were:

 Improve the receiver design to provide a lower system temperature that would be roughly constant across the bandwidth of the receivers
 Replace the FPGA chips in the digital processor to faster chips with lower power consumption
 Replace the water cooling system in the PAF by a more reliable Peltier temperature stabilisation system
 Replace the coaxial signal transmission between the antennas and the central site by a system in which the radio frequency signals were directly modulated onto optical signals to be transmitted over optical fibre
 Replace the complex radio-frequency signal conversion system by a direct sampling system

Although the ADE delayed the completion of ASKAP, this was felt to be justified as the resulting system had better performance, was lower cost, and more reliable. The first ADE PAF was installed in August 2014. By April 2016, nine ADE PAFs were installed, together with the new ADE correlator, and more PAFs were progressively installed on the remaining antennas over the next few years.

Early science 
From 2015 until 2019, a series of ASKAP Early Science Projects were observed on behalf of the astronomical community, across all areas of astrophysics, with the primary goals of demonstrating the  capabilities of ASKAP, providing data  to the astronomy community to facilitate  development of techniques, and evaluating the performance and characteristics of the system. The early science program resulted in several science papers published in peer-reviewed journals, as well as helping to commission the instrument, and guiding the planning of the main survey projects.

Pilot surveys 
Each of the ten Science Survey projects were invited to submit a proposal for a pilot survey to test observing strategies. These pilot survey observations took place in 2019-2020 and have resulted in significant astrophysical results, including the discovery of Odd Radio Circles.

Rapid ASKAP Continuum Survey (RACS) 
From 2019 to 2020, ASKAP conducted a rapid survey of the entire sky up to declination +40°, to provide a shallow model of the radio sky to aid the calibration of subsequent deep ASKAP surveys, as well as providing a valuable resource to astronomers. With a typical rms sensitivity of  0.2-0.4 mJy/beam and a typical spatial resolution of 15-25 arcsec, RACS is significantly deeper, and higher resolution,  than comparable radio surveys such as NVSS and SUMMS. All the resulting data will be placed in the public domain.

The survey mapped three million galaxies in 300 hours, a million of which are new.

Full survey operations 
The ten Science Survey projects are expected to start observing in 2022, although there may be some adjustment and realignment of the projects before that date.

Discoveries 
In May 2020, astronomers announced a measurement of the intergalactic medium using six fast radio bursts observed with ASKAP; their results confirm existing measurements of the missing baryon problem.

Odd radio circles (ORCs) are a possible "new class of astronomical object" discovered at ASKAP.

See also 

 List of radio telescopes
 AARNet
 LOFAR
 MeerKAT

References

External links 
 
 CSIRO homepage
 Australia and New Zealand SKA (anzSKA) project website
 International SKA website
 The Pawsey Centre

Shire of Murchison
Radio telescopes
Square Kilometre Array
CSIRO
Infrastructure completed in 2012
2009 establishments in Australia
Astronomical observatories in Western Australia
Interferometric telescopes